Hollingworth may refer to:

 Hollingworth (surname)
 Hollingworth, a village in Tameside, Greater Manchester
 Hollingworth Lake, Littleborough, Greater Manchester
 Hollingworth Reservoir near Hollingworth, Tameside

See also
 Hollingsworth